Jerry Badiuk (born October 2, 1954) is a Canadian retired professional ice hockey player. He was selected by the Atlanta Flames in the fifth round (82nd overall) of the 1974 NHL amateur draft, and was also selected by the Houston Aeros in the eighth round (119th overall) of the 1974 WHA Amateur Draft.

Prior to turning professional, Badiuk played major junior hockey with the Kitchener Rangers in the Ontario Hockey Association. He was picked in both the 1974 NHL amateur draft and the 1974 WHA Amateur Draft, and he went on to play four seasons of professional hockey with the Toledo Goaldiggers, Omaha Knights, and Baltimore Clippers. Badiuk was primarily employed as a defenceman, but he also played right wing for the Toledo Goaldiggers during the 1976–77 season.

References

External links

Jerry Badiuk 2011 Interview - Toledo Hockey History Night (YouTube.com)

1954 births
Living people
Atlanta Flames draft picks
Baltimore Clippers players
Canadian ice hockey defencemen
Houston Aeros draft picks
Ice hockey people from Ontario
Kitchener Rangers players
Omaha Knights (CHL) players
Rochester Americans players
Sportspeople from Windsor, Ontario
Toledo Goaldiggers players